Norefjell is a mountain range in the Scandes Mountains system in Norway. It stretches between the valleys of Eggedal (west) and Hallingdal (east).  It covers parts of the municipalities Flå, Sigdal, and Krødsherad, all in the county Buskerud.

The  highest peaks within the mountain range are:
 Gråfjell, 
 Høgevarde, 

Norefjell Ski Resort is an alpine ski resort located in the municipality Krødsherad. It is about one and a half hours drive north of Oslo. Norefjell was host to the downhill and giant slalom competitions of the 1952 Winter Olympics.

The Norefjell mountain range is named after the old farm Nore (see Noresund). The last element is fjell meaning 'mountain'.

References

External links
 1952 Winter Olympics official report. pp. 36–8. 
 On The Snow - Norefjell (English)
 Norefjell Skiresort Official website
  Oslo Vinterpark Official website

Mountain ranges of Norway
Krødsherad
Flå
Sigdal
Mountains of Viken